Chlamydogobius micropterus, the Elizabeth Springs goby, is a species of goby endemic to Elizabeth Springs in the Shire of Diamantina, Queensland, Australia where it occurs in shallow, marshy pools.  This species can reach a length of  SL.

References

Elizabeth Springs goby
Freshwater fish of Queensland
Critically endangered fauna of Australia
Elizabeth Springs goby
Taxa named by Helen K. Larson
Taxonomy articles created by Polbot